Henry "Hank" Ernest Schichtle (born October 13, 1941) is a former American football quarterback who played one season with the New York Giants of the National Football League. He was drafted by the New York Giants in the sixth round of the 1964 NFL Draft. He first enrolled at the University of Hawaii before transferring to Coffeyville Community College and lastly Wichita State University. Schichtle attended Field Kindley High School in Coffeyville, Kansas. He was also a member of the Atlanta Falcons, San Francisco 49ers, Waterbury Orbits and BC Lions.

Early years
Schichtle played football, basketball, baseball and golf for the Field Kindley High School Golden Tornado and graduated with honors from the school.

College career

University of Hawaii
Schichtle attended the University of Hawaii for one semester.

Coffeyville Community College
Schichtle transferred to play for the Coffeyville Red Ravens for two seasons under head coach Dean Pryor and was enrolled at the school for three academic semesters. He completed over 56% of his passes for over 1,300 yards in 1961 while the Red Ravens finished the year with a 9-2 record and were ranked in the top ten of all junior college teams in the country. The highlight of the team's year was a season-ending 33-6 win over the Wichita State Shockers' freshmen team. Schichtle completed 17 of 29 pass attempts for 272 yards against the Shockers. He was also a Phi Delta Theta member at Coffeyville. He was inducted into the Lettermen's Hall of Fame at Coffeyville Community College in 2003.

Wichita State University
Schichtle was later recruited by the Wichita State Shockers and played for the team from 1962 to 1963. His former head coach Dean Pryor also joined the Shockers as an assistant coach. Schichtle set several season and career records for the Shockers in 1962. He was named co-captain and the Most Valuable Player of the 1963 team. He also earned All-MVC honors and was named an Honorable Mention All-American in 1963. Schichtle was also a Cum Laude graduate and an Academic All-American at Wichita State. He was inducted into the Wichita State University Athletic Hall of Fame in 1981.

Professional career

New York Giants
Schichtle was selected by the New York Giants with the 81st pick in the 1964 NFL Draft and played in one game for the team during the 1964 season. He was released by the Giants on August 31, 1965.

Atlanta Falcons
Schichtle signed with the Atlanta Falcons in February 1966 and was released by the team on July 7, 1966.

San Francisco 49ers
Schichtle was later signed by the San Francisco 49ers. He was released by the 49ers on August 1, 1966. An excerpt of his NFL career is used as an example for the phrase "cup of coffee" in The Dickson Baseball Dictionary.

Waterbury Orbits
Schichtle played for the Waterbury Orbits of the Atlantic Coast Football League in 1966.

BC Lions
Schichtle played in seven games, starting one, for the BC Lions during the 1967 season.

References

External links
Just Sports Stats
College stats

Living people
1941 births
Players of American football from Oklahoma
Players of American football from Kansas
American football quarterbacks
Canadian football quarterbacks
American players of Canadian football
Hawaii Rainbow Warriors football players
Coffeyville Red Ravens football players
Wichita State Shockers football players
New York Giants players
BC Lions players
Sportspeople from Tulsa, Oklahoma